Balance is the tenth studio album by American rock band Van Halen, released on January 24, 1995, by Warner Bros. Records. The album is the last of the band's four studio releases to feature Sammy Hagar as the lead singer. It is also the final Van Halen album to feature bassist Michael Anthony in its entirety. Balance reached number 1 on the U.S. Billboard 200 in February 1995 and reached Triple Platinum status on May 12, 2004, by selling more than three million copies in the U.S. "The Seventh Seal" was nominated for a Grammy for Best Hard Rock Performance.

Recording and production
According to Ian Christe's book, Everybody Wants Some: The Van Halen Saga, Balance was released amid internal fighting between Sammy Hagar and the Van Halen brothers. The band worked eight-hour days for three months recording the album. The first song on the record, "The Seventh Seal", features mystical overtones that came, in part, from Eddie's newfound sobriety. His therapist, Sat-Kaur Khalsa, urged him to relax and imagine where he was after drinking a six-pack of beer. After smoking cigarettes, drinking beer, and playing guitar for 20 years, he tried writing songs sober and wrote three songs in one half hour period. The album then moves into Hagar's territory with "Can’t Stop Lovin’ You". This song was taken from his ex-wife's point of view, believing that she was still in love with him. The album reached number 1; their fourth consecutive number one studio album.

Most of the Balance album was recorded at Eddie Van Halen's 5150 Studios, located in Studio City, except for five lead vocal tracks that were recorded in Vancouver, where the album's producer Bruce Fairbairn resided. It was mixed by Mike Fraser and mastered at Sterling Sound, New York, by George Marino.

Following the recording of Balance and its subsequent Ambulance Tour (the band renamed the "balance" tour to the "ambulance tour" because Eddie was having hip issues and brother Alex had to wear a neck brace), Van Halen's second incarnation broke up. Regarding this time period, in 1997, Eddie Van Halen told Guitar World: "There had been a variety of conflicts brewing between manager Ray Danniels, Sammy, and the band since I quit drinking on October 2, 1994... It got so bad that I actually started drinking again."

"The Seventh Seal" kicks off the album. Complete with chanting monks and dangling metal bells, the song unveiled a vast, open, U2-like guitar wall that propelled through the darkest terrain the band ever tackled. As a side note Eddie revealed in 2012 that "The Seventh Seal" was written before Van Halen became a band.

"Amsterdam" was written about Eddie and Alex Van Halen's birthplace. Eddie is on record in Guitar World as saying, "I always hated the words to 'Wham, Bam Amsterdam', from Balance, because they were all about smoking pot. They were just stupid. Lyrics should plant some sort of seed for thought, or at least be a little more metamorphical." This is another song based on an idea that predates the album's sessions as there is video of Eddie playing the riff to "Amsterdam" at 5150 Studios in 1985

During The Balance tour show in Pensacola, Florida, Hagar stated that "Take Me Back (Déjà Vu)" was "a true story". The song itself features a then almost 20-year-old riff Eddie had previously used on a song entitled "No More Waiting", which the band played on occasion in the pre-Van Halen I era, making it the third known song on the album based on an older idea.

Artwork
The original title of the album was The Seventh Seal, for which photographer Glen Wexler created some concepts, including one with an androgynous four-year-old boy. Eventually they picked Balance, which Alex explained to Wexler was about the turmoil and changes surrounding Van Halen, including the recent death of long-time manager Ed Leffler. Alex asked for something "exploring the duality of the human psyche"; Wexler then sketched some new concepts, with the band liking the one with conjoined twins on a see-saw. The androgynous boy, who actually hailed from Denver but fans mistakenly considered to be Eddie's son Wolfgang Van Halen, was then photographed in Wexler's Hollywood studio, with Wexler's daughter being the hand model that pulled his hair. The images were combined with a miniature landscape for the background using Fractal Design Painter (now called Corel Painter). Wexler detailed that the Balance cover had a number of ironies: "the impossibility of the conjoined twins actually playing on the seesaw; the 'calm' twin actually being the aggressive one, pulling the hair of his sibling to create the appearance of an aggressive child; and having no one else to play with in a desolate post-apocalyptic setting, in which unusable playground equipment is the only object in sight." He added that the twins were “designed” to mimic the shape of the “VH” logo. An alternate cover was used for the Japanese release, citing a cultural offense to the original version. On the inside, the compact disc shows the Leonardo da Vinci drawing Vitruvian Man, and the back of the booklet shows an egg balanced upright on a guitar.

Release and promotion
Balance was released January 24, 1995, and is the first release by a platinum-certified act on Warner Bros. since Danny Goldberg stepped in as chairman/CEO. It is also the band's first album since the loss of their longtime manager Ed Leffler, who died of thyroid cancer on October 16, 1993, before Ray Danniels took over management of the band (mostly due to Alex's personal relationship with Danniels as brother-in-law). Warner Bros. VP of merchandising and advertising Jim Wagner said that early 1995 would be the right time to release a new Van Halen album, as "It seems like we've always had success with big acts right after the first of the year". (Van Halen's own 1984 was released in early January 1984.) "Don't Tell Me (What Love Can Do)", the first single from Balance, was released to top 40 and album rock radio on December 28, 1994. Van Halen became the first act to debut at No. 1 in 1995, as their first week sales of 295,000 units earned Balance the number one spot on the Billboard 200. The opening-week tally for Van Halen's Balance was 21% higher than that of For Unlawful Carnal Knowledge, the band's previous studio album, which topped the chart with 243,000 units in the summer of 1991.

Two concerts during the Balance tour were filmed and aired as a pay-per-view event at the Molson Amphitheatre in Toronto, Ontario, Canada on August 18 and 19. There was talk of releasing a live DVD of the performances, which found the band to be at their peak during the tour. While the release of the DVD never materialized, most of the source material can be viewed on YouTube.

Track listing

The Japanese bonus track "Crossing Over" was used as the B-side to the US CD single for "Can't Stop Lovin' You".

Vinyl track listing

Personnel
Van Halen
Sammy Hagar – lead vocals, guitar
Eddie Van Halen – guitar, keyboards, background vocals
Michael Anthony – bass guitar, background vocals
Alex Van Halen – drums, percussion

Additional personnel
Steve Lukather – background vocals ("Not Enough")
The Monks of Gyuto Tantric University – chants ("The Seventh Seal")

Production
Bruce Fairbairn – production
Mike Fraser – mixing
Jeri Heiden – art direction
George Marino – mastering
Erwin Musper – engineer
 Mike Plotnikoff – engineer
Randee Saint Nicholas – photography
Glen Wexler – photography (front cover)

Charts

Weekly charts

Year-end charts

Singles

Certifications

References

1995 albums
Van Halen albums
Warner Records albums
Albums produced by Bruce Fairbairn
Albums recorded at Little Mountain Sound Studios